The Detroit Cast  is a comedy podcast based in Franklin, Michigan, hosted by Mike Wolters, Jay Boger, and Eric Fadie, and primarily discusses current events. The show was broadcast five days a week with a live video feed on youtube.com during the recording,  which was then distributed as a podcast on iTunes. The last released episode was #1463 on 11/5/2020. After the most recent episode, the hosts stopped releasing new episodes, implying that the show was cancelled.

History
Long before the end of the Drew and Mike show, Mike Wolters had been building a home studio. The idea was to continue doing the Drew and Mike show, and on the weekends put together a podcast which would not have any FCC regulations. It was a new and promising medium for broadcasters who were being handcuffed around the country. At that time, it seemed as though, weekly, big powerful shows were being torn down for ‘offending’ small groups of people; groups that had no history of being avid listeners of such shows in the first place. After the announcement was made that the Drew and Mike show would be ending, it seemed like the perfect time to start the podcast.

The DrewCast launched, hosted by Drew Lane, Marc Fellhauer and Mike Wolters. Episode One, simply called the D, M & M Show, was posted online and within 24-hours former bassist Tim Krukowski from the rock band Sponge called, and was on board to fine tune the audio for the show. Sure to his promise, Krukowski got the show up and running with a more professional sound and web presence. Krukowski, serving as engineer, would bring stability for many months to come. The DrewCast was never intended to be a long-term show, however, but it was a start. After only 17 episodes, Drew and Marc were off to Detroit Sports 105.1 FM, and it was decision time for Mike. Should he join Drew and Marc back on terrestrial radio, or bet his entire career on a long shot with podcasting, without a partner or a team? The Detroit Cast started with a call to Mike Clark. Would he like to do a little show out of Mike Wolters’ basement? Clark was in and The Detroit Cast began. The problem was that there was no money in doing it this way. No sponsors, no advertisers. It's easy to get on board with a project when people are getting paid for what they do, but at this time it just wasn't an option. So the show started out as 3 days per week, and it was anything but easy. Let's be honest, Mike and Mike aren't quite ‘start-a-business’ kind of guys. After some fun and funny shows, Mike Clark needed to tend to some family issues and had to do what was best for him and part ways with the podcast, which was understandable. By this time there was a new engineer in the mix, Jay Timko. Mike then convinced former Drew and Mike show intern Eric Fadie into leaving and quitting his job in radio on the other side of the state, move BACK into his parents' basement and come be a part of a show that paid nothing.

The Detroit Cast reborn, and at this point there was no looking back…all chips in. An engineer, a producer, and a host—would it be a three-person team? Would they find a veteran radio guy to co-host? Would they look for a comedian to come sit in? A few weeks went by, and no matter what ideas were tossed around, one name kept popping into Mike's head—Jay. But it just didn't make sense – Jay was married with 3 kids, and was a partner in a law firm. In fact, Jay was closer to being miserable as a lawyer, than to being happy in that field. So the call was made, and wouldn't you know it – the son-of-a-bitch had just quit his job a few days earlier.

The Detroit Cast was set at that point. The team felt right and after a few bumps and bruises, things sort of fell into place.

Before long it was decided that in order to really make the show work, it would have to become a 5-day-a-week operation. So it did. To try and give the show a better chance at survival, a Kickstarter campaign was set up with what felt like an unattainable goal to reach – raise $20,000 in 30 days. $45,000 was raised instead! The audience who listen to The Detroit Cast will never fully understand how important that was! In no way does that guarantee any success, but it gives the show a chance! Fingers crossed!

On June 9, 2016, The Detroit Cast was honored by the city of Houghton, Michigan with the key to their city as well as having the day being named "Detroit Cast Day".

The last episode aired on 11/5/2020.  No word on if any future episodes will be made.

Crew

Mike Wolters
Mike Wolters started in terrestrial radio back in 1995 as an unpaid intern on the Drew and Mike morning show at WRIF in Detroit. After about nine months, he left and headed to Lansing, MI to co-host the Mike and Mike show at 92.1 The Edge. Shortly thereafter he was teamed up with Dave The Beagle and the Mike and The Beagle Show was born. After being fired from the show, Wolters and The Beagle moved on to Kalamazoo, MI and landed at 92.3 The Edge. After a year, during which he was believed by a number of media outlets to be an alcoholic, the show was cancelled. It was at this time that Wolters went home to Metro Detroit and collaborated on Drew and Mike.

Wolters' last regular show from "Radio For One Studios" was episode 1443 on 3/4/2020, with him moving out of state shortly thereafter. After calling in for several remote episodes, he returned to "Radio For One Studios" for three episodes; 1461(10/29/2020), 1462 (11/2/2020), and 1463 (11/5/2020). Episode 1463 is the last released podcast.

Jay Boger 
Jay Boger is a lawyer, though In 2014, he left the law firm where he was a  partner.  and Mike have been friends for twenty-five years, although they initially chose far different personal and professional paths. Jay has been married for seventeen years and has three children.

In January 2020 Jay joined the team at Northcoast Wealth Management according to a mass e-mail sent by him. In part, the email read, "In January, I joined a team of financial experts at Northcoast Wealth Management." It went on to describe his role and how he can assist clients while working under long time Detroit Cast sponsor Mark Lebovitz.

Jay's last appearance was Episode 1422 on 1/16/2020.

Eric "Big E" Fadie 
Eric Fadie or BIG E was fascinated with radio ever since he was a kid and always knew he wanted to work in it in some capacity, if the truck driving thing didn't work out. When his dad would take him to the auto show he would be more interested in watching the local radio stations broadcasting live than walking around and looking at the cars. After high school Fadie eventually decided that he would pursue a career in radio broadcasting. He then got a job and started saving up the money to pay for tuition. Eric enrolled in Specs Howard School of Broadcast Arts in October 2005. During his time at Specs Howard he also was a promotional intern for Greater Media.

While interning ran into WCSX DJ John O’Leary and was offered the opportunity to help out on his Saturday night show. It soon became a regular Saturday night thing that lasted until the end of his time at Specs Howard. Eric graduated from Specs Howard in June 2006. Once graduated from Specs Eric made the choice to forgo searching for a radio job right away to instead pursue a filming project he had been involved in with a group of friends that called themselves The Renegade Tube Team. That sucked so he once again turned his attention to his first passion, radio. Being out of Specs for a few years he knew he needed something fresh for his resume in order to get the attention of radio stations. In a last ditch effort, he messaged several radio stations on Facebook. One of them was producer of The Drew and Mike show Mike Wolters. Mike was the only one to get back and soon Eric was again an intern at Greater Media but this time for his radio hero's the Drew and Mike morning show. Eric's internship for the Drew and Mike show for almost ended up lasting about a year and a half. During this time his strange and awkward personality eventually led him getting on the air on a regular basis. During his internship with Drew and Mike he finished up classes at Oakland Community College, earning his associates in broadcast communications. He started sending out resumes for jobs in radio all over the country. Eventually he would except a board operator position at a small AM/FM station in Holland, MI.

While there, he ran the board for local high school and college sporting events as well as Sunday church services. After working there for a little over a year he received an opportunity from Mike Wolters to come back to the Detroit area and work on The Detroit Cast podcast. He enjoys telling stories of soliciting prostitutes, sex acts with pregnant prostitutes, losing various personal items to prostitutes, bartering services in exchange for electronics with prostitutes, and group sex with prostitutes.

Eric has moved on to cohost a new podcast, 2Hippies1Drunk, along with Tyler Charles and Scott Ryan.

Awards

The Podcast Awards
The Detroit Cast is a two-time Podcast Award nominee for the "Best Comedy" and "People's Choice" categories in the 2015 10th Annual Podcast Awards.

The Detroit Cast was a nominated again for the "Best Comedy" category in the 2016 Podcast Awards 

The Detroit Cast received nominations in 4 categories for the 2017 Podcast Awards. "Comedy" "Entertainment" "Mature" & "People's Choice"

Key to the city of Houghton, Michigan
The Detroit Cast has been honored by the city of Houghton, Michigan, with the key to their city. Along with being bestowed with the key to the northern Michigan city the day, June 9, is now known as "Detroit Cast Day" into perpetuity.

References

External links
 

Comedy and humor podcasts